The 2011 S.League season is Geylang United's 16th season in the top flight of Singapore football and 36th year in existence as a football club. The club will also competed in the Singapore Cup and the Singapore League Cup.

Squad

Coaching staff

Pre-Season Transfers

In

Out

Mid-Season Transfers

In

Out

Pre-season Friendlies

References 

Geylang International
Geylang International FC seasons